Corey Marks is an American poet.

Biography
Corey Marks holds a Ph.D. in Creative Writing and Literature from the University of Houston, an MFA from the Program for Writers at Warren Wilson College, and a BA in English from Kalamazoo College. He teaches at the University of North Texas and serves, with Bruce Bond, as Poetry Editor of American Literary Review.

His work appears in Antioch Review, Black Warrior Review, New England Review, Southwest Review, TriQuarterly, The Virginia Quarterly Review, Paris Review, Legitimate Dangers, and elsewhere.

Awards

 1999 National Poetry Series, for Renunciation
 2003 National Endowment for the Arts Fellowship
 Natalie Ornish Prize from the Texas Institute for Letters
 Bernard F. Conners Prize from The Paris Review 
 2011 Green Rose Prize from New Issues Press, for "The Radio Tree"

Poetry collections

Online Works
"Portrait of a Child", NEA

References

Year of birth missing (living people)
Living people
American male poets
Kalamazoo College alumni
Warren Wilson College alumni
University of Houston alumni
University of North Texas faculty